Hans Esser (born 15 January 1909, date of death unknown) was a German fencer. He won a bronze medal in the team sabre event at the 1936 Summer Olympics.

References

1909 births
Year of death missing
German male fencers
Olympic fencers of Germany
Olympic fencers of West Germany
Fencers at the 1936 Summer Olympics
Fencers at the 1952 Summer Olympics
Olympic bronze medalists for Germany
Olympic medalists in fencing
Sportspeople from Essen
Medalists at the 1936 Summer Olympics